Bredell is one of the easternmost suburbs of Kempton Park, in Gauteng province, South Africa. It was the site of the Bredell land occupation in 2001.

References

Suburbs of Kempton Park, Gauteng